Admiral Harris may refer to:

Charles Harris (Royal Navy officer) (1887–1957), British Royal Navy rear admiral
Edward Harris (Royal Navy officer) (1808–1888), British Royal Navy admiral
Gregory N. Harris (born 1965), U.S. Navy rear admiral
Harry B. Harris Jr. (born 1956), U.S. Navy admiral
Michael Harris (Royal Navy officer) (born 1941), British Royal Navy rear admiral
Nicholas Harris (born 1952), British Royal Navy rear admiral
Robert Harris (Royal Navy officer) (1843–1926), British Royal Navy admiral